Purtell Park is a rugby league ground in Bardon, a suburb in Brisbane's west, in Queensland, Australia. It is now the home of Wests Juniors Rugby League Football Club (catering for approximately 300 young players), Normandy (Hounds) Rugby League Football Club, Voices of Birralee (catering for approximately 400 young singers), Western Districts Gymnastics, and a venue for Premier Touch Football. A community arts centre which provides meeting rooms for community organisations has been set up in what used to be the football clubhouse.

It was the home ground for the Western Suburbs Panthers, who played in the Queensland Rugby League South East Queensland Division's Mixwell Cup and Mixwell Colts Challenge, and who played in the Queensland Cup until the end of 2003. The venue is now used by the West Brisbane Panthers Junior Rugby League Club.

See also

 Sport in Queensland

References

Sports venues in Brisbane
Rugby league stadiums in Australia
Rugby union stadiums in Australia
Bardon, Queensland
Wests Panthers